Ch'uspini (Aymara jaju, ch'uspi mosquito, -ni a suffix to indicate ownership, "the one with mosquitos", also spelled Chuspini) is a mountain in the Andes of Peru, about  high. It is situated in the Puno Region, Carabaya Province, on the border of the districts Coasa and Usicayos. Ch'uspini lies northeast of the mountain Hatun Pinkilluni.

References

Mountains of Puno Region
Mountains of Peru